Shakura S'Aida is a Canadian blues vocalist, songwriter and actress. She is sometimes credited Shakura.

History
Shakura S'Aida was born in Brooklyn and lived in Switzerland before moving to Canada.

S'Aida was lead singer of the 13-piece world music ensemble Kaleefah, before embarking on her solo career. She has also performed as a backing vocalist for Rita MacNeil and Patti LaBelle, as well as with jazz musicians such as Jimmy Smith and Ruth Brown. She has also been nominated for several Juno Awards for her music.

S'Aida independently released her first solo album, Blueprint, in 2008.  Her second album, Brown Sugar, was released in 2010 on Ruf Records.  In 2012, she released a double CD, Time, on Electro-Fi Records.

As an actress, she starred in a Toronto production of George Boyd's Consecrated Ground in 2004, as well as Sudz Sutherland's Doomstown in 2006 and Sharon Lewis's film Brown Girl Begins in 2018.

In 2013, she was nominated for a Blues Music Award in the 'Contemporary Blues Female Artist' category.

Discography
Time (2012, Electro-Fi)
Brown Sugar (2010, Ruf)
Blueprint (2008, independent)

Filmography

Film

Television

Theatre

Awards and nominations

References

External links 
 Shakura S'aida on IMDb

Actresses from Toronto
Black Canadian actresses
21st-century Black Canadian women singers
Canadian blues singers
Canadian stage actresses
Canadian television actresses
Canadian voice actresses
Canadian world music musicians
Living people
Musicians from Toronto
Year of birth missing (living people)
Ruf Records artists
20th-century Black Canadian women singers